The fourhorn poacher (Hypsagonus quadricornis), also known as the four-horned sea-poacher, is a fish in the family Agonidae. It was described by Achille Valenciennes in 1829, originally under the genus Aspidophorus (now Agonus). It is a marine, temperate water-dwelling fish which is known from the northern Pacific Ocean, including the Sea of Okhotsk, the Sea of Japan, the Bering Sea, the Kuril Islands, and Washington, USA. It inhabits sediments of sand and gravel.

The fourhorn poacher is preyed on by Hippoglossus stenolepis. Its own diet consists of crustaceans including shrimp, crabs, isopods, amphipods, and ostracods, as well as bony fish, gastropods, and polychaetes.

References

Fourhorn poacher
Fish described in 1829